Ampelophaga thomasi is a moth of the family Sphingidae. It was described by Ian J. Kitching and Jean-Marie Cadiou in 1998. It is known from Nepal.

References

thomasi
Moths described in 1998
Moths of Asia